József Gera (24 October 1896 – 12 March 1946) was a Hungarian physician and politician of the Arrow Cross Party. 

He fought in the First World War and he was honoured. After the war he practised as a paediatrician in Makó. He had been a member of the Arrow Cross Party - Hungarist Movement since 1939. From 1944 he was responsible for the organizing of the party. Gera was elected to a member of the Regent Council, replacing Ferenc Rajniss, in March 1945. 

After the Second World War he was sentenced to death by the People's Tribunal in Budapest. He was executed on 12 March 1946, along with Ferenc Szálasi, Gábor Vajna and Károly Beregfy.

Sources
 Magyar Életrajzi Lexikon, niif.hu; accessed 24 January 2018.
 Karsai Elek-Karsai László: A Szálasi per, Reform Kiadó, 1988.

1896 births
1946 deaths
People from Makó
Hungarian politicians
Hungarian Nazis
Hungarian pediatricians
Austro-Hungarian military personnel of World War I
Hungarian people of World War II
Hungarian people convicted of war crimes
Executed Hungarian collaborators with Nazi Germany
People executed by Hungary by hanging
People executed for war crimes
Arrow Cross Party politicians